The Man Who Made Good is a 1917 American silent comedy drama film directed by Arthur Rosson and starring Jack Devereaux, Winifred Allen and Henry Dixon.

Cast
 Jack Devereaux as Tom Burton
 Winifred Allen as Frances Clayton
 Henry Dixon as Flash Lewis 
 Barney Gilmore as Josiah Whitney
 Albert Tavernier as Pop Clark
 Blanche Davenport as Mom Clark

References

Bibliography
 Robert B. Connelly. The Silents: Silent Feature Films, 1910-36, Volume 40, Issue 2. December Press, 1998.

External links
 

1917 films
1917 drama films
American silent feature films
American black-and-white films
Triangle Film Corporation films
Films directed by Arthur Rosson
1910s English-language films
1910s American films
Silent American drama films